Josip Kozarac (18 March 1858 – 21 August 1906) was a Croatian writer.

Josip Kozarac was born in Vinkovci, Croatia. He studied forestry management in Vienna and later served as forestry official in Vinkovci.

He wrote stories, plays and novels. In them he showed great ability to portray Slavonian peasants and expressed his displeasure over the decay of Slavonian economy and foreigners taking over Croatian national wealth. His most well-known work is his novel, Mrtvi kapitali (1890).

Works
Biser-Kata
Male pripovijesti
Među svjetlom i tminom
Mira Kodolićeva
Mrtvi kapitali
Oprava
Priče djeda Nike
Slavonska šuma
Tena

See also
 Ivan Kozarac

Sources
Kozarac, Josip at lzmk.hr 

1858 births
1906 deaths
Croatian foresters
Croatian novelists
Male novelists
People from Vinkovci
Croatian male short story writers
Croatian short story writers
Croatian male writers
19th-century novelists
19th-century short story writers
19th-century male writers